In enzymology, a hydroxycinnamate 4-beta-glucosyltransferase is an enzyme that catalyzes the chemical reaction

UDP-glucose + trans-4-hydroxycinnamate  UDP + 4-O-beta-D-glucosyl-4-hydroxycinnamate

Thus, the two substrates of this enzyme are UDP-glucose and trans-4-hydroxycinnamate (p-coumaric acid), whereas its two products are UDP and 4-O-beta-D-glucosyl-4-hydroxycinnamate.

This enzyme belongs to the family of glycosyltransferases, specifically the hexosyltransferases.  The systematic name of this enzyme class is UDP-glucose:trans-4-hydroxycinnamate 4-O-beta-D-glucosyltransferase. Other names in common use include uridine diphosphoglucose-hydroxycinnamate glucosyltransferase, UDP-glucose-hydroxycinnamate glucosyltransferase, and hydroxycinnamoyl glucosyltransferase.

References 

 

EC 2.4.1
Enzymes of unknown structure
Hydroxycinnamic acids metabolism